The Sirens of TI was a free nightly show provided by the Treasure Island Hotel and Casino on the Las Vegas Strip in Paradise, Nevada. The show entailed a group of sensual and tempting sirens engaging with a band of renegade pirates led by the infamous Blackbeard. The show closed in 2013.

Story 
The show opens with Siren leader "Sin" Cinnamon narrating a warning about their power over the sea. Soon afterwards, the adventuring pirate Eros boards the Siren ship The Song, after which he is discovered and overwhelmed by its crew. Eros is bound to the mast and demands his release, threatening the Sirens with the wrath of Captain Mack.

Mack and the pirate crew from The Bull sail into Sirens' Cove to rescue Eros. The Sirens exchange greetings with the "salty crew" of The Bull and Eros asks his crewmates to leave, as he is happy with his new arrangement. The pirates first fire a warning shot across the bow of The Song, and then fire on the warehouse behind the Sirens' ship, which holds their closet. In retaliation, the Sirens use their power over the ocean to summon a storm to engulf The Bull and sink it to the bottom of the sea.

As The Bull sinks, Captain Mack orders his crew to abandon ship and vows vengeance. The Sirens force Eros to walk the plank, but he and the rest of the pirates soon climb aboard The Song, where a second battle ensues. As the pirates finally realize they're no match for the Sirens, they decide to surrender and the deck of The Song turns into a 21st-century party.

Battle of Buccaneer Bay
From 1993 to 2003, Treasure Island featured a battle between pirates aboard the Hispaniola (which later became the Sirens' ship, The Song) and British sailors aboard HMS Britannia (later the pirate ship The Bull), ending in the sinking of HMS Britannia. The Battle of Buccaneer Bay (in some sources, The Pirate Battle of Buccaneer Bay at Treasure Island) ran for 16,334 shows.

History 

In October 2003, The Sirens of TI replaced The Battle of Buccaneer Bay, which was geared towards a younger audience and had been playing since Treasure Island opened on October 27, 1993. Director and choreographer Kenny Ortega created The Sirens of TI show, inspired by Homer's Odyssey. Songwriter Emilio Estefan prepared the score and Travis Payne handled show choreography.

The show commemorated its fifth anniversary on October 21, 2008 when the street leading into the hotel/casino property was renamed from "Buccaneer Boulevard" to "Sirens Cove Boulevard."  At that time, the show was presented four times daily, at 7, 8:30, 10 and 11:30 p.m.  Beginning November 3, 2008, the show was presented at 5:30, 7, 8:30 and 10 p.m. daily.

On October 20, 2013, the show was halted for what was intended to be a temporary closure until December 26, for the construction of retail space nearby. However, in late November 2013, Treasure Island announced that the closure was permanent, and that some of the space would be used for new shops, surprising several cast members. The new shopping mall reduced the size of Sirens Cove by approximately one-third, and while the ships still exist, the Bull no longer moves (The Song never moved). The cove now features several water fountains, and no show replaced the Sirens of TI.

Statistics
The show featured a cast of sixteen sirens and fourteen pirates. When it started, the cast consisted of thirteen sirens and eleven pirates. It was estimated to cost $5 million per year.

More than eighty individual pieces of pyrotechnics were shot per show. Flame effects consumed  of liquid propane per show. The sound system had more than 40,000 watts of power. By 2011, over the course of 7,440 shows, 630,000 pieces of pyrotechnics had been detonated,  of propane had been fired, and The Bull had traveled  (The Song never moved).

The original runtime for the show was 28 minutes. Dialogue and choreography tweaks shortened it to 18 minutes by 2005 to better match the patience of the standing crowd. The attendance for the premiere showing at 6 p.m. on October 26, 2003 was estimated at 5,000, double the standing capacity of 2,500; during the premiere, the crowd spilled from the sidewalk onto Las Vegas Boulevard, forcing the closure of several lanes. It had been viewed by more than 10 million over 4,749 performances by 2008, and nearly 17 million over 7,440 performances by 2011.

Reception
Soon after its premiere, Martin Stein wrote "Sirens is foundering and taking on water" in his review for the Las Vegas Weekly, adding "the choreography is boring [and] all the action is far too small for a show in which the audience will often be across six lanes of traffic." Readers of the Las Vegas Review-Journal voted it the worst local attraction in 2004 and 2005. The Los Angeles Times advised readers to avoid the show, calling it "dumb and a major pain to watch." Despite the negative feedback, the Las Vegas Weekly later collectively named "Sirens" and its pirate show predecessor "Buccaneer Cove" the eighth-greatest attraction in Las Vegas history in 2017. It was also named a "must-see" by Michelin.

Notable performers
Amanda Avila, American Idol contestant (season 4)
Tiffany Coyne, model
AnnaLynne McCord, actress

See also
 Jubilee!
 Absinthe
 Peepshow
 Moulin Rouge
 Le Lido
 Folies Bergère
 Casino de Paris
 Paradis Latin
 Cabaret Red Light
 Tropicana Club

References

External links 

Sirens of TI at Treasure Island, Las Vegas(archive)
  (Summarized, 7:46 runtime)
  (nearly complete, 18:48)
 
 

Las Vegas Strip
Piracy in fiction
Production shows in the Las Vegas Valley